Prosopalpus styla, the widespread dwarf skipper, is a butterfly in the family Hesperiidae. It is found in Senegal, the Gambia, Guinea, Burkina Faso, Sierra Leone, Ivory Coast, Ghana, Nigeria, Cameroon, southern Sudan, Uganda, western Kenya, Tanzania and north-western Zambia. The habitat consists of marshy open areas in savanna and forests.

Adults males are known to mud-puddle.

The larvae feed on Poaceae species.

References

Butterflies described in 1937
Erionotini